A tenaculum is a surgical instrument, usually classified as a type of forceps. It consists of a slender sharp-pointed hook attached to a handle and is used mainly in surgery for seizing and holding parts, such as blood vessels.

Uses include:
Steadying the cervix and uterus, as is done during insertion of an intrauterine device or during a surgical abortion (although recent research indicates that an allis clamp may be better suited for those tasks, as it is less likely to cause bleeding complications). 
Seizing and holding arteries in various surgical procedures.

History 
The tenaculum has been commonly used in gynecology for over a century. The predecessor of cervical tenaculum was a forceps bullet extractor – a common surgeon’s tool used to extract bullets on the battlefields. During the Civil War in the United States, this tool was used to remove bullets from the patient’s body or to pull out arteries to tie them off. Inspired by the shape of the bullet extractor, Samuel Jean Pozzi, a pioneer of modern gynecology, developed, at the end of 19th century, a gynecological tool called the Pozzi forceps, also known as the tenaculum. Since then, its shape has hardly changed and persists until today.

See also
Instruments used in general surgery

References

Surgical instruments